Willem Jan Mühring (17 August 1913 – 17 January 1997) was a Dutch chess International Master (IM) (1951).


Biography
Willem Mühring was one of the pioneers in the implementation of IBM computers in Netherlands public administration.

Also Willem Mühring was a well-known tournament chess player and international chess master (1951). He learnt the game at the age of fifteen. In 1932, Willem Mühring won the Rotterdam City Chess Championship. In 1947, in Hilversum he ranked 2nd in an International Chess Tournament before Max Euwe.
After Second World War he successfully played in Hastings International Chess Congress:
 1947/1948 shared 2nd - 3rd place;
 1948/1949 ranked 3rd place.
In 1955, in Johannesburg he shared 1st in International Chess Tournament before Max Euwe.

Willem Mühring played for Netherlands in the Chess Olympiad:
 In 1956, at fourth board in the 12th Chess Olympiad in Moscow (+3, =10, -4).

Willem Mühring played for Netherlands in the unofficial Chess Olympiad:
 In 1936, at sixth board in the 3rd unofficial Chess Olympiad in Munich (+4, =9, -4).

Willem Mühring played for Netherlands in the European Team Chess Championship preliminaries:
 In 1957, at sixth board in the 1st European Team Chess Championship preliminaries (+0, =2, -0).

Willem Mühring played for Netherlands in the Clare Benedict Chess Cup:
 In 1953, at fifth board in the 1st Clare Benedict Chess Cup in Mont Pèlerin (+3, =2, -0) and won team and individual gold medals.

References

External links

Willem Mühring chess games at 365chess.com

1913 births
1997 deaths
People from Velsen
Dutch chess players
Chess International Masters
Chess Olympiad competitors
20th-century chess players
Sportspeople from North Holland